Cuban Stars may refer to:
Cuban Stars (West), a team of Cuban and baseball players from other Latin American countries that competed in the United States Negro leagues from 1907 to 1930
Cuban Stars (East), a team of Cuban and baseball players from other Latin American countries that competed in the Negro leagues in the eastern United States from 1916 to 1929
Pollock's Cuban Stars, a team of Cuban baseball players that competed in the Negro leagues in the United States from about 1928 to 1936

See also 
New York Cubans, a team of Cuban and baseball players from other Latin American countries that competed in the United States Negro leagues, as a reincarnate of the old Cuban Stars teams, from 1935 to 1950